Elia Barceló or Elia Eisterer-Barceló (born 29 January 1957) is a Spanish academic and author who lives in Austria.

Life
Barceló was born in Elda in 1957. She became an academic and earned her doctorate in Innsbruck, Austria in 1995. She remained in Austria, working as a professor of Spanish literature. She also writes science fiction novels and works for children. She has won a number of awards.

Her Heart of Tango was published in an English translation in 2010.

Awards 
 Premio Ignotus, science fiction, 1991
 Premio TP de oro, young adult literature, 1997 and 2006
 Premio Internacional, science fiction novella, Polytechnic University of Catalonia (Premio UPC), 1993
 Premio Celsius, 2014
 Premio Ignotus, 2018
 Premio Edebé, children's and young adult literature

Selected works
Sagrada, 0000
Consecuencias Naturales, 0000
El mundo de Yarek, 0000
El caso del Artista Cruel, 0000
La mano de Fatma, 0000
El vuelo del hipogrifo, 0000
El caso del crimen de la ópera, 0000
El secreto del orfebre, 0000
Disfraces terribles, 0000
El contrincante, 0000
Cordeluna, 0000
Corazón de Tango, 0000
El almacén de las palabras terribles, 0000
La roca de Is
Las largas sombras, 0000
Caballeros de Malta, 0000
Anima mundi, 0000

References

1957 births
Living people
People from Elda
Spanish women writers